The 1925–26 Torquay United F.C. season was Torquay United's fifth season in competitive football and their fourth season in the Southern League.  The season runs from 1 July 1925 to 30 June 1926.

Overview
Torquay United's fourth season in the Southern League saw them face a much depleted fixture list with the Western Section reduced to only fourteen teams due to the departure of six of the Welsh sides.  As a result, the remaining English teams joined to form the Professional Section of the Western League to provide themselves with additional fixtures.  This gave the Magpies an extra eighteen games to play on top of their Southern League commitments.

Under new player-manager Percy Mackrill, Torquay made a hesitant start to their Southern League campaign and were without a win in their first six matches.  However, the Plainmoor faithful were rewarded for their patience in December when the Magpies scored a total of twelve goals in their Christmas and Boxing Day fixtures against Taunton United and Bath City.  Torquay eventually finished 6th in the Southern League which, even with just fourteen teams competing, was certainly an improvement on the previous season.  Torquay also made a good showing in the Western League, finishing in 3rd place.

Much of the Torquay's success during the season was due to the goalscoring of new forward George Appleyard, signed from local rivals Exeter City.  Effortlessly filling the boots of the recently departed Billy Kellock, Appleyard scored an impressive 29 goals in all competitions.  He made a particular impression in the FA Cup, scoring in all five Qualifying rounds and getting Torquay to the First Round Proper for the very first time.  Their reward was a visit from high-flying Third Division South side Reading.  6,000 supporters at Plainmoor witnessed Torquay take a first half lead over their League opponents before Reading equalised through a penalty which forced a replay at Elm Park.  A late equalising goal from George Appleyard in that match saw the fixture taken to a second replay, to be held at Bristol City's Ashton Gate ground.  However, it was to be third time unlucky for the Magpies as the League side eventually emerged with a 2–0 victory.

It was an outstanding performance by Torquay over the eventual Third Division South champions and certainly strengthened their case for election to the Football League.  However, for the time being at least, the Magpies made no attempt to enter the Third Division South at the end of the season and instead looked forward to another Southern League campaign.

League statistics

Southern League Western Section

Western League Professional Section

Results

Southern League Western Section

Western League Professional Section

FA Cup

Devon Professional Cup

References

External links

Torquay United
Torquay United F.C. seasons